Paradoxica parki is a moth of the family Erebidae first described by Michael Fibiger in 2011. It is found in central Thailand.

The wingspan is about 10 mm for males and 11 mm for females. The forewings are short and relatively narrow and the ground colour is beige. There are black-brown patches basally on the costa (these are quadrangular in males and triangular in females) as well as in the upper medial and terminal areas. The crosslines are weakly marked in males and light brown. They are untraceable in females. The terminal line is indicated by black-brown interveinal dots. The hindwing ground colour is grey with a well-marked discal spot.

References

Micronoctuini
Moths described in 2011